Georges Stern (1882 – October 28, 1928), nicknamed "The King of the Derbies"and "King of the Jockeys", was a French jockey.  He rode in both England and France.

Stern, who was Jewish, was born in France to British parents, who were naturalized in France.

In 1904, he won the Grand Prix, the French Derby (riding Ajax), the French Oaks (Profane), the Austrian Derby (Con Amore), the German Derby (Con Amore), and the Baden Baden Prix (Caius).

In 1908 he won the French Derby, the Austrian Derby, and the German Derby, and finished second in the Belgian Derby.

In 1898, at 17 years of age, in Colombes Stern won his first race riding Finlas, a horse owned and trained by his father. In 1900, he won the debut Grand Prix de Deauville, riding Amedee. That year, with 91 wins he ranked as the best jockey in the world.  He won the Deauville again in 1901 (riding Jacobite), 1902 (Maximum), and 1909 (Biniou).

He won the 1911 Epsom Derby (riding Sunstar).  He was a six-time winner of the Prix du Jockey Club’s French Derby—in 1901 (Saxon), 1904 (Ajax), 1908 (Quintette), 1913 (Dagor), 1914 (Sardanapale), and 1922 (Ramus).  He won the Grand Prix de Paris in 1904 (Ajax), 1913 (Bruleur), 1914 (Sardanapale), and 1922 (Ramus).

He retired in 1926.  In his career, he had over 1,000 victories.  He died at the age of 48, in November 1928 in France.

In 1993, he was elected a member of the International Jewish Sports Hall of Fame.

References

French jockeys
1882 births
1928 deaths
19th-century French Jews
Jewish sportspeople